Radha Govind University  is a private university located in Lalki Ghati, Ramgarh district, Jharkhand, India.

Campus
The campus is spreaded over 33 acers of land with all the required facilities like transportation,play ground, library, internet facility and all.

Academics
Radha Govind University offers all types of undergraduate as well Post graduate courses in many streams like Engineering, Diploma, Management, Science, Arts and Commerce etc.

History

Radha Govind Shiksha Swasthava Trust was Established in 19 August 2013 at Ramgarh Cantt by Sri Baijnath Sah in the sacred memory of his father Late Sri Govind Sah and mother Late Smt. Radha Devi.

See also
Education in India
List of private universities in India
List of institutions of higher education in Jharkhand

References

External links

Private universities in India
Universities in Jharkhand
Ramgarh district
Educational institutions established in 2018
2018 establishments in Jharkhand